Martti Matilainen (18 September 1907 – 20 October 1993) was a Finnish runner who finished fourth in the 3000 m steeplechase at the 1932 and 1936 Olympics. In 1936 he also competed in the 1500 m, but failed to reach the final. His elder brothers Jukka and Kalle were also Olympic runners.

References

1907 births
1993 deaths
Finnish male middle-distance runners
Finnish male steeplechase runners
Olympic athletes of Finland
Athletes (track and field) at the 1932 Summer Olympics
Athletes (track and field) at the 1936 Summer Olympics
People from Iisalmi
Sportspeople from North Savo